Love's Brother is a 2004 film written and directed by Jan Sardi.

Plot
Angelo Donnini and his younger brother Gino are of Italian origin, living in Australia in the 1950s. Angelo is insecure, silent and introverted and not at all good-looking, while Gino is the complete opposite: outgoing, funny and handsome. Angelo looks for a wife and writes letters to Italian girls in hope of a match. But his letters are always returned with his photograph. One day, he desperately sends a new letter with a picture of his brother to Rosetta, who falls in love instantly with the man in the picture and therefore accepts his marriage proposal. When she arrives in Australia she is, of course, appalled that Angelo does not look like the man she thought she had married. However, she stays, to try to gain Gino's affections. But Gino has a girlfriend, Connie, a wise and tough girl who knows exactly what she wants. She loves Gino but wishes he possed more of Angelo's qualities. Though Gino tries to avoid Rosetta, he cannot help but eventually fall in love with her. Gino and Connie have an argument and they call it quits, and Angelo and Connie start to develop a romance. In the end, Rosetta, believing that she has failed to gain Gino's affections, decides to return to Italy with the help of Father Alfredo. Gino follows her onto the ship and they embrace. The couple then marry. In the final scene of the film, which seems to be a few years later, it shows the wedding party of Connie and Angelo, while Gino is married to Rosetta and they have a newborn baby.

Main cast
Giovanni Ribisi – Angelo Donnini
Adam Garcia – Gino Donnini
Joe Petruzzi – Zio Luigi
Amelia Warner – Rosetta
Silvia De Santis – Connie
Barry Otto – Father Alfredo

Locations

Love's Brother was filmed on location at Daylesford and Hepburn Springs, Glenlyon, Smeaton and Talbot, Victoria, Australia, and on location at Civita di Bagnoregio, Italy.

Budget

The budget for the film was reported to be approximately $10million. This figure would have included the additional costs necessary for official co-productions.

Box office
Love's Brother grossed $977,106 at the box office in Australia.

See also
Cinema of Australia

References

External links

Love's Brother at the National Film and Sound Archive
 Love's Brother at Ozmovies

2004 films
2004 romantic drama films
Australian romantic drama films
Films directed by Jan Sardi
Films set in the 1950s
Films set in Australia
Films scored by Stephen Warbeck
2000s English-language films
2000s Australian films